2005 Denmark Open is a darts tournament, which took place in Denmark in 2005.

Results

Last 16

References

2005 in darts
2005 in Danish sport
Darts in Denmark